Bulbophyllum absconditum, known as the hidden bulbophyllum, is a species of orchid in the genus Bulbophyllum. It is named the hidden bulbophyllum because of its miniature flower which eludes being found due to camouflage.

It is found in rainforests in Indonesia and certain parts of Oceania such as Vanuatu and New Caledonia. It is a warm-growing epiphyte found in elevations of 900 to 1700 meters.

References

The Bulbophyllum-Checklist
The Internet Orchid Species Encyclopedia

External links
 Smith, J.J. Drawing of Bulbophyllum absconditum, Die Orchideen von Java, Leiden, E.J. Brill, 1911.

absconditum
Plants described in 1905